Sh2-7 is an emission nebula in the Scorpius constellation.  The nebula is around the star Delta Scorpii.  It lies next to a large reflection nebula, Sh2-1.

According to the paper Interstellar magnetic cannon targeting the Galactic halo. A young bubble at the origin of the Ophiuchus and Lupus molecular complexes, the HII region Sh2-7 may be acting as a faraday screen, altering the polarization of the GCS.

References

External links
NASA APOD Sharpless 249 and the Jellyfish Nebula 

Scorpius (constellation)
Emission nebulae